The Netherlands were represented at the 2006 European Athletics Championships by the following athletes.

Results

Athletes 
Men's 200 metres:
 Caimin Douglas - Round 2, 21.18 s (did not advance)
 Patrick van Luijk - Round 2, 21.46 s (did not advance)
 Guus Hoogmoed - Semi final, 20.80 s (did not advance)

Women's 200 metres:
 Jacqueline Poelman - Round 2, 24.01 s (did not advance)

Men's 400 metres:
 Youssef El Rhalfioui - Round 1, 47.12 s (did not advance)

Women's 400 metres:
 Romara van Noort - Round 1, 52.64 s (PB, did not advance)

Men's 800 metres:
 Bram Som - Final, 1:46.56 min (gold medal)

Women's 1500 metres:
 Bob Winter - Semi final, 3:48.35 min (did not advance)

Women's 1500 metres:
 Adriënne Herzog - Semi final, 4:11.16 min (PB, did not advance)

Men's 5000 metres:
 Gert-Jan Liefers - Final, 13:58.70 min (8th place)

Women's 10,000 metres:
 Lornah Kiplagat - Final, 30:37.26 min (SB, 5th place)
 Selma Borst - Final, 32:41.12 min (PB, 19th place)

Men's marathon:
 Luc Krotwaar - 2:12:44 hrs (4th place)
 Kamiel Maase - 2:13:46 hrs (9th place)
 Sander Schutgens - 2:17:11 hrs (PB, 19th place)
 Hugo van den Broek - 2:17:25 hrs (22nd place)

Men's 110 metre hurdles:
 Marcel van der Westen - Round 1, 13.73 s (did not advance)
 Gregory Sedoc - Semi final, DQ (did not advance)

Men's 3000 metre steeplechase:
 Simon Vroemen - Final, DNS

Women's 3000 metre steeplechase:
 Andrea Deelstra - Semi final, 10:46.12 min (did not advance)
 Miranda Boonstra - Final, 10:20.01 min (12th place)

Men's 4x100 metre relay:
 Timothy Beck, Caimin Douglas, Guus Hoogmoed, and Patrick van Luijk - 39.64 (8th place)

Men's high jump:
 Jan-Peter Larsen - Qualification, 2.05 metres (did not advance)
 Wilbert Pennings - Final, 2.20 metres (12th place)

Men's pole vault:
 Laurens Looije - Final, 5.50 metres (8th place)
 Christian Tamminga - Final, 5.40 metres (15th place)

Women's pole vault:
 Rianna Galiart - Qualification, 4.00 metres (did not advance)

Women's long jump:
 Karin Ruckstuhl - Qualification, 6.29 metres (did not advance)

Men's shot put:
 Rutger Smith - Final, 20.90 metres (4th place)

Women's shot put:
 Denise Kemkers - Qualification, 15.98 metres (did not advance)

Men's discus:
 Rutger Smith - Final, 64.46 metres (7th place)

Men's decathlon:
 Eugène Martineau - 8035 points (11th place)

Women's heptathlon:
 Karin Ruckstuhl - 6423 points (NR, silver medal)

See also
Netherlands at other European Championships in 2006
 Netherlands at the 2006 European Road Championships

References
Complete results of the 2006 European Championships

Netherlands
European Athletics Championships
Netherlands at the European Athletics Championships